The CSA OrthoCarolina Sportsplex is a soccer complex containing two stadiums located in Pineville, North Carolina near the South Carolina state line. The complex is owned by the Charlotte Soccer Academy and sponsored by OrthoCarolina, a regional orthopedic practice.

About
The four outside fields opened in 2015 with the stadium fields opening one year later. The facility is owned by the Charlotte Soccer Academy, which was formed in 2009 following the merger of the South Charlotte Soccer Association and the Charlotte Soccer Club.

In 2019 the Matthews-based National Independent Soccer Association club Stumptown Athletic announced that they would play a number of "showcase season" games at the facility.

References

External links
 OrthoCarolina Sportsplex

Sports venues in Mecklenburg County, North Carolina
Sports venues completed in 2016
Soccer venues in North Carolina
Sports complexes in the United States